Sunshine Becomes You is a 2015 Indonesian romance film directed by Rocky Soraya and based on Sunshine Becomes You (book) by . The film was about love story of Alex Hirano and Mia Clark. Shooting location was on New York, United States.

Cast 
  as Alex Hirano, a pianist
 Boy William as Ray Hirano, Alex Hirano's brother
 Nabilah JKT48 as Mia Clark, a ballet dancer
 Annabella Jusuf as Lucy
 Sam Brodie as Carl (Alex Hirano's assistant)

References

External links 

2015 films
Indonesian romantic drama films
2010s Indonesian-language films